Walter Creed Haymond (December 2, 1893 – March 1983) was an American track and field athlete. He is occasionally cited by leaders of The Church of Jesus Christ of Latter-day Saints as an example of the benefits that can result from abiding by the Word of Wisdom, a health code for Latter-day Saints.

Haymond was a member of the Church of Jesus Christ of Latter-day Saints. He graduated from Springville High School and competed in track and field through his high school years. He attended the University of Utah where he lettered 3 times and was the captain of the track team. He studied at the University of Pennsylvania, where he became the captain of the track team. At the 1919 Inter-Collegiate Association track meet, he broke the world record time for the 220-yard race. Haymond later attributed part of his success that day to his decision the night before to refuse his track coach's offer of sherry, as the Word of Wisdom (found in Section 89 of the Church's Doctrine and Covenants) prohibits consumption of alcohol. This was reminiscent of a promise he made to his mother as a young child that he would never drink tea, coffee, liquor, or tobacco; after they attended a stake conference with a powerful focus on the Word of Wisdom.

Haymond was accepted to compete as a sprinter for the U.S. team at the 1920 Summer Olympics, but he was injured before the competition. In 1920, Haymond became a dentist, so that he could advocate more people of the benefits of the Word of Wisdom. He was one of the patriarchs of the Cottonwood Stake when James E. Faust was the president of that stake. Haymond was a vocal advocate of the Word of Wisdom.

He died in March 1983 and his wife, Elna Parkinson Haymond, of 61 years, died the same day of a heart attack.

References

2009 Deseret Morning News Church Almanac (Salt Lake City, Utah: Deseret Morning News), p. 326.
Joseph J. Cannon, “Speed and the Spirit,” Improvement Era, Oct. 1928, pp. 1001–1007
James E. Faust, “The Enemy Within,” Ensign, November 2000, pp. 44–46
L. Tom Perry, “‘Run and Not Be Weary’,” Ensign, November 1996, p. 36
Creed Haymond's obituary
1919 Inter-Collegiate Association track meet results

American leaders of the Church of Jesus Christ of Latter-day Saints
American male sprinters
Penn Quakers men's track and field athletes
College men's track and field athletes in the United States
American dentists
Patriarchs (LDS Church)
1893 births
1983 deaths
Latter Day Saints from Utah
Latter Day Saints from Pennsylvania
20th-century dentists